Chilton County School District is a school district in Chilton County, Alabama, United States.

References

External links
 

School districts in Alabama